Elmar-Aleksander Lehtmets (14 December 1901 Paasvere Parish, Virumaa – 17 July 1942 Sevurallag, Sverdlovsk Oblast) was an Estonian lawyer, journalist and politician. He was a member of VI Riigikogu (its Chamber of Deputies).

Lehmets was arrested by the NKVD following the Soviet occupation of Estonia during World War II and executed.

References

1901 births
1942 deaths
People from Vinni Parish
People from the Governorate of Estonia
Patriotic League (Estonia) politicians
Members of the Riigivolikogu
20th-century Estonian lawyers
Estonian journalists
 University of Tartu alumni
Estonian military personnel of the Estonian War of Independence
Estonian people executed by the Soviet Union
People who died in the Gulag